Michael Dennis McQuay (3 June 1949 – 27 May 1995) was an American science fiction writer. His series include Mathew Swain, Ramon and Morgan, Executioner, and SuperBolan. The Book of Justice series he wrote as Jack Arnett. He also wrote the second of the Isaac Asimov's Robot City novels. His non-series novel Memories was nominated for a Philip K. Dick Award in 1987.

McQuay taught creative writing at the University of Central Oklahoma for more than ten years, and died of a heart attack at 45.

Mathew Swain novel series 
Hot Time in Old Town (1981)
When Trouble Beckons (1981)
The Deadliest Show in Town (1982)
The Odds are Murder (1983)

Non-series novels 
Life-Keeper (1980)
Escape from New York (1981)
State of Siege (1984)
Jitterbug (1984)
My Science Project (1985)
The MIA Ransom (1986)
Memories (1987)
Isaac Asimov's Robot City: Suspicion (1987)
The Nexus (1988)
Pixel (1988)
Puppetmaster (1991)
Richter 10 (1996) (with Arthur C. Clarke)

References

External links 
Bibliography with book cover gallery at FantasticFiction.co.uk

 
 Jeff Arnett at LC Authorities (2 records) and at WorldCat

20th-century American novelists
American male novelists
American science fiction writers
1949 births
1995 deaths
American male short story writers
20th-century American short story writers
20th-century American male writers